Benito Pabón y Suárez de Urbina (25 March 1895 – 1958) was an Andalusian lawyer, trade unionist and member of the Congress of Deputies of Spain for the city of Zaragoza during the last legislature of the republican period. He was a lawyer of the workers and peasants of the CNT, later becoming part of the trentista current - first joining the Federal Democratic Republican Party and later the Syndicalist Party.

Biography
Benito Pabón y Suárez de Urbina was born in Seville on 25 March 1895 into a wealthy family. His father, Benito Pabón y Galindo, was an Integrist, and his mother, Teresa Suárez de Urbina y Cañaveral, was a Carlist. His uncle José Ignacio Suárez de Urbina was a prominent Catholic publicist and leader of the Traditionalist Communion in Córdoba. In his youth, Benito was also a member of the Carlist cause and was part of the Jaimista Youth of Villanueva del Río. Benito later studied with the Jesuits and at the Law Institute of Seville, then went on to work as a labor lawyer in Granada, Zaragoza and Madrid.

Second Republic
During the time of the Second Spanish Republic, he led the defense of various cases related to workers' causes. As a lawyer, Pabón defended the farmers implicated in the Casas Viejas incident, as well as those jailed after the anarchist insurrection of January 1933.

In the 1936 Spanish general election he was elected deputy of Zaragoza, with 44,545 votes out of the 85,178 cast, running as an independent. In parliament, on 3 July 1936 he responded to Angel Galarza (PSOE) in relation to the amnesty of political prisoners, arguing against the interpretation given to the Ley de vagos y maleantes:

Civil War
On 18 July 1936 Pabón was in Madrid, integrating into the Harriers Column. He was later elected as General Secretary of the Regional Defense Council of Aragon and was a member of the Legal Commission of the Ministry of Justice under Joan García Oliver. As a defense lawyer of the Workers' Party of Marxist Unification (POUM), he had to go into exile in August 1938, and commented on what happened in May 1937:

Exile
After a short stay in France he left for the Philippines. But when Japanese forces occupied Manila he was imprisoned in the military prison of Fuerte Santiago, from which he was released in the fall of 1942. He then left for Latin America, earning a living as a Spanish language teacher in Santiago de Veraguas and Colón, where he settled permanently after a stay in Mexico. He died in Panama in 1958.

Notes

References

Bibliography 
 
 
 
 
 
 
 
 
 
 
 

People from Andalusia
1895 births
1958 deaths
People from Seville
Politicians from Andalusia
Confederación Nacional del Trabajo members